WFLE-FM (95.1 FM) is a radio station broadcasting a country music format.  Licensed to Flemingsburg, Kentucky, United States, the station is currently owned by Dreamcatcher Communications, Inc. and features programming from Fox News Radio, Jones Radio Network and Motor Racing Network.

History
The station went on the air as WFLE-FM on 1994-02-14.  On 1994-02-28, the station changed its call sign to the current WFLE, and on 1994-03-07, to the current WFLE,

References

External links

FLE-FM
Fleming County, Kentucky